Philippe Plisson (born 12 January 1951 in Saint-Caprais-de-Blaye, Gironde) was a member of the National Assembly of France.  He represented the 11th constituency of the Gironde department from 2007 to 2017 as a member of the Socialist Party.

References

1951 births
Living people
People from Gironde
Socialist Party (France) politicians
Deputies of the 13th National Assembly of the French Fifth Republic
Deputies of the 14th National Assembly of the French Fifth Republic
Politicians from Nouvelle-Aquitaine